Kerouac is a crater on Mercury. Its name was adopted by the International Astronomical Union (IAU) in 2015, after American author and poet Jack Kerouac.

Kerouac is located west of the Caloris Planitia.  To the west of Kerouac is the peak-ring basin Raditladi.

References

Impact craters on Mercury